Bungala Boys is a 1961 Australian family film directed and written by Jim Jeffrey. It was the second Australian based film made by the British Children's Film Foundation, following Bush Christmas and was the first non-documentary film to focus on surf clubs.

Plot
Brian is a newcomer to Bungala Beach, near Sydney. He forms a new surf lifesaving club which wins first prize in a surf boat race.

Cast
 Peter Couldwell – Tony Wakeford
 Alan Dearth – Brian Wakeford
 Terry Bentley – Normie
 Julie Youatt – Nancy Phelan
 Ross Vidal – Timmy
 Geoffrey Parsons – Buzz
Jon Dennis as Hatch
 Max Osbiston as Reg Phelan
 Leonard Teale as Sam Taylor
 John Sherwood
 Margaret Roberts
 Jack Amistead
 Betty Dyson

Production
The film was based on Claire Meillon's children's novel The New Surf Club (1959). Meillon was formerly assistant fiction editor of The Australian Women's Weekly. The book was based on her brother founding Newport Surf Club. The name "Bungala" was a combination of "Bilolga" and "Bungan".

Jimar Productions made the film at the request of the Children's Film Foundation.

The film was shot on location at Bungan Beach and at Artransa Studios in Sydney in  April–May  1961. Many of the child stars had never acted before.

The actors were given brief training in surf lifesaving.

Release
The film was released in the UK, Canada and Europe before Australia.

References

External links
 
Film page at AustLit
Bungala Boys at BFI
Bungala Boys at Letterbox DVD
Bungala Boys at Oz Movies

Australian children's films
1961 films
1960s English-language films